Ákos Kállai (born 29 March 1974, Budapest) is a modern pentathlete from Hungary. He competed at the 2004 Summer Olympics in Athens, where he finished eighteenth in the men's event, with a score of 5,132 points.

Kállai is a six-time world champion and seven-time European champion for the team and relay events in the men's modern pentathlon. He achieved his best result in 2003, when he won the championship title at the Steffi Cup, in his home turf.

References

External links
 
 Profile – Kataca Online 

1974 births
Living people
Hungarian male modern pentathletes
Olympic modern pentathletes of Hungary
Modern pentathletes at the 2004 Summer Olympics
Sportspeople from Budapest
World Modern Pentathlon Championships medalists